Haiba is a village in Harju County, Estonia. Prior to the administrative reform of Estonian local governments in 2017, the village was the administrative centre of Kernu Parish.

References

 

Villages in Harju County
Kreis Harrien